Arabesque is the ninth studio album of Rondò Veneziano. The international album is famous as Misteriosa Venezia.

Track listings

Arabesque 
Arabesque - 3:06
Corso delle gondole - 2:27
Feste veneziane - 2:30
Profumo d'oriente - 3:18
Fiaba antica - 3:09
Armonie - 2:37
La scala d'oro - 3:24
Arcobaleno - 3:30
Ritorno a Venezia - 3:09
Affresco - 2:27
Specchio della laguna - 4:10
Rive e marine - 2:10

Misteriosa Venezia
 Misteriosa Venezia - 3:05
 Arcobaleno - 3:29
 Ritorno a Venezia - 3:09
 Armonie - 2:36
 Fiaba antica (I parte) - 2:46
 Cameo - 3:43
 Fiaba antica (II parte) - 1:34
 Feste veneziane - 2:28
 Affresco - 3:21
 Specchio della laguna - 4:10
 Porta d'oriente - 3:15
 Corso delle gondole - 2:25
 Rive e marine - 2:11

References

1986 albums